"Give Me Louisiana" is one of the state songs of Louisiana. It was written in 1970 by Doralice Fontane, and arranged by Dr. John Croom.

Lyrics:

Give me Louisiana,
The state where I was born
The state of snowy cotton,
The best I've ever known;
A state of sweet magnolias,
And Creole melodies
Oh give me Louisiana,
The state where I was born
Oh what sweet old memories
The mossy old oaks bring
It brings us the story of our Evangeline
A state of old tradition,
of old plantation days
Makes good old Louisiana
The sweetest of all states.

Give me Louisiana,
A state prepared to share
That good old southern custom,
Hospitality so rare;
A state of fruit and flowers,
Of sunshine and spring showers
Oh give me Louisiana,
The state where I was born
Its woodlands, Its marshes
Where humble trappers live
Its rivers, Its valleys,
A place to always give
A state where work is pleasure,
With blessings in full measure
Makes good old Louisiana
The dearest of all states.

Give me Louisiana,
Where love birds always sing
In shady lanes or pastures,
The cowbells softly ring;
The softness of the sunset
Brings peace and blissful rest
Oh give me Louisiana,
The state where I was born
The smell of sweet clover
Which blossoms everywhere
The fresh new mown hay
Where children romp and play
A state of love and laughter,
A state for all here after
Makes good old Louisiana
The grandest of all states.

See also
 List of U.S. state songs

References

1970 songs
Songs about Louisiana
Symbols of Louisiana
Louisiana